Jeremias Jorge "Jerry" Sitoe (born 23 November 1990) is a Mozambiquan footballer who plays as a forward for ENH de Vilankulos.

He has also played for Académica in the Portuguese Primeira Liga, who he joined from Clube Ferroviário de Maputo in 2011. Despite only being 21 years of age, Sitoe has already won twenty caps for the Mozambique national team, scoring four goals.

Club career

Clube Ferroviário de Maputo
Sitoe began his career with Ferroviário in the 2007 season, as the club finished seventh in the Moçambola. He was then part of the club's title-winning squad in 2008, scoring 9 goals in 23 matches to become the league's third top–scorer. Ferroviário retained the title in 2009, and Sitoe also had a successful season, scoring 16 goals in 26 matches becoming the league's top scorer. The club finished third in the league in 2010, with Sitoe scoring 16 goals and becoming the league's top scorer. and also reached the second round of the 2010 CAF Champions League. Sitoe played a key role in Ferroviário's success, scoring in the preliminary round first leg against Apache Club de Mitsamiouli in a 5–3 win on 12 February 2010. He then bagged a brace in the second leg in a 4–1 victory on 27 February, ensuring Ferroviário's progress to the second round. There, they met South African giants SuperSport United, with the forward scoring in the 2–0 second leg win on 3 April.

Liga Muçulmana de Maputo

Sitoe joined Liga Muçulmana, another Maputo-based club, ahead of the 2011 season. The club won the Moçambola for the second consecutive season, five points ahead of nearest rivals Maxaquene Maputo. Sitoe left the club during the 2011 season to join Académica of Portugal.

Académica

Sitoe signed for the club on 28 July 2011. Upon joining Académica, he was assigned the squad number 25. He made his debut for the club in a 2–0 loss to Gil Vicente FC on 27 August 2011. In January 2012, Sitoe was released by Académica along with midfielder Júlio César Oliveira Martins.

UTA Arad

After being released by the Briosa, Sitoe returned to Liga Muçulmana de Maputo. He was set to join Portuguese Liga de Honra side C.D. Trofense on a six-month loan deal in January 2012, but the move eventually broke down. Instead, Site joined Romanian Liga II side FC UTA Arad on loan in February 2012. Sitoe scored his only league goal for the club in a 3–0 victory over FC Chindia Târgoviște on 19 May 2012; he played his last game for UTA Arad a week later.

AD Oeiras
In July 2012 Sitoe went on trial with Serbian club FK Sloboda Užice, but a subsequent transfer failed to materialise and he returned to Liga Muçulmana. A month later he signed for Portuguese third-tier outfit AD Oeiras and pledged, "I'll try to [score] ten goals and, if possible, go to a club in a higher league". Sitoe scored on his Oeiras debut, a 2–2 draw at Oriental Lisboa on 2 September. He then found the net in his third appearance for the club, scoring the equaliser in a 1–1 draw at SC Farense on 30 September. Sitoe's seventh Oeiras appearance yielded his third goal for the club, a second-half winner in a 1–0 victory over CD Fátima on 11 November 2012. His next league goal came on 22 December 2012 against CD Ribeira Brava; despite having three players sent off, Oerias managed to secure a 2–2 draw. Sitoe's form for Oeiras attracted the interest of Primeira Liga side SC Olhanense, who invited the player for a trial on 24 January 2013. Sitoe accepted the offer of a trial, and featured in Olhanense's 2–0 friendly defeat to Angolan side Atlético Petróleos Luanda the same day, in a team largely made up of fellow triallists.

PFC Beroe

In March 2013 Sitoe joined top-flight Bulgarian side PFC Beroe Stara Zagora. He made his debut for the club on 16 March as a substitute in a 2–0 win at Etar 1924; following several further appearances, mainly from the substitutes' bench, Sitoe scored his first Beroe goal in a 2–1 win over Lokomotiv Plovdiv on 22 May.

Panachaiki
In August 2013 Sitoe became part of the ranks of Greek club  Panachaiki.

International career
Sitoe played for Mozambique's U-20 side at the 2006 Lusophony Games in Macau, held in October 2006. He scored a second-half hat-trick in a 5–0 win over East Timor in the group stage. Mozambique won the bronze medal in the tournament.

He then progressed to Mozambique's senior side, making two substitute appearances in 2006. Sitoe had to wait until 2009 for his next international caps. He played three games that year, including a late substitute appearance in a 1–0 win over Kenya on 6 September 2009, coming on for Tico-Tico.

2010 saw Sitoe play more of a role for Mozambique, playing four games. He played the full 90 minutes of the 3–0 friendly defeat to Portugal on 8 June 2010, before coming on as a substitute in a 1–0 win over Comoros on 9 October. On 4 June 2011 he again came on as a substitute in Mozambique's 3–0 loss to Zambia. He then played the full 90 minutes in a 1–0 win over Comoros on 11 November 2011, and scored Mozambique's second goal in a 4–0 win over the same opponent on 15 November.

International goals
Scores and results list Mozambique's goal tally first.

Honours
Ferroviário de Maputo
Moçambola: 2008, 2009

Liga Desportiva
Moçambola: 2010

References

External links
 
 

Living people
1990 births
Sportspeople from Maputo
Mozambican footballers
Clube Ferroviário de Maputo footballers
Association football forwards
Associação Académica de Coimbra – O.A.F. players
FC UTA Arad players
AD Oeiras players
PFC Beroe Stara Zagora players
Panachaiki F.C. players
First Professional Football League (Bulgaria) players
Liga II players
Mozambican expatriate footballers
Mozambican expatriate sportspeople in Portugal
Expatriate footballers in Portugal
Expatriate footballers in Romania
Mozambican expatriate sportspeople in Romania
Expatriate footballers in Bulgaria
Mozambican expatriate sportspeople in Bulgaria
Expatriate footballers in Greece
Mozambican expatriate sportspeople in Greece
Liga Desportiva de Maputo players
UD Songo players
Vilankulo F.C. players
Moçambola players
Mozambique international footballers